The Toronto Maple Leafs are a professional ice hockey team based in Toronto, Ontario. The team is a member of the Atlantic Division in the Eastern Conference of the National Hockey League (NHL) and is one of the Original Six teams of the NHL. There have been 39 head coaches in their franchise history; one during the era of the Toronto Arenas (1917–1919), seven during the era of the Toronto St. Patricks (1919–1927) and the rest under the Toronto Maple Leafs (1927–present). Five Maple Leafs coaches have been inducted into the Hockey Hall of Fame as players: Dick Irvin, Joe Primeau, King Clancy, Red Kelly, and Dick Duff while five others have been inducted as builders: Conn Smythe, Hap Day, Punch Imlach, Roger Neilson, and Pat Quinn.

Frank Carroll (brother of the team's first NHL coach, Dick Carroll) has the highest winning percentage of any Maple Leafs coach, with a .625 record from the 24 games he coached in his single 1920–21 season. Neither Mike Rodden nor interim coach Dick Duff, who coached only two games each in 1927 and 1980 respectively, won a game with the team. Dan Maloney has the worst record of any who coached more than a season, with a .328 winning percentage from 160 games. Punch Imlach coached the most games of any Maple Leafs coach with 750 games from 1959 to 1969. Pat Burns is the franchise's only coach to win the Jack Adams Award awarded to the head coach "adjudged to have contributed the most to his team's success." Pat Quinn also won the award, but with two teams prior to coaching the Maple Leafs.

The current head coach is Sheldon Keefe, who became the 40th head coach in franchise history on November 20, 2019.

Key

Coaches
Statistics are up to date as of the 2019–20 season.

References

General

 
Specific

External links
 Toronto Maple Leafs official website

 
Toronto Maple Leafs head coaches
head coaches